PG-13 is the debut studio album by American drag queen Sharon Needles, released on January 29, 2013. It included a cover of Ministry's 1984 single "(Every Day Is) Halloween". The album is a dance-pop and punk album, with elements of metal and electronica.

Reception
Fred Thomas from AllMusic praised the album, saying "PG-13, is an apt reflection of his macabre personality, blending club pop beats with tongue-in-cheek takes on horror movie topics, often blurring the lines between terror and sexuality. Highlights of the album include the energetic 'This Club Is a Haunted House', featuring a cameo by RuPaul, and 'I Wish I Were Amanda Lepore', featuring none other than Amanda Lepore."
PG-13 debuted at number 186 on the US Billboard 200 chart, selling 3,000 copies in its first week.

Track listing

Charts

References

2013 debut albums
Dance music albums by American artists
Sharon Needles albums